Jeffrey Wilson Tackett (born December 1, 1965 in Fresno, California) is a former backup catcher for the Baltimore Orioles from 1991 to 1994. A career .217 hitter, Tackett was more renowned for his defensive skills behind the plate than for his hitting. He also made cameos as himself in the films Bob Roberts and Dave, the latter he caught the ceremonial first pitch thrown by the president.

He went to Dos Caminos grade school and Los Altos Middle School, and was a 1984 graduate of Adolfo Camarillo High School in Camarillo, California, the school at which his father Terry became the principal.

Tackett is one of a number of baseball players on the list of Major League Baseball players with a home run in their final major league at bat.

References

External links
 Baseball Reference - Jeff Tacket

1965 births
Baltimore Orioles players
Hagerstown Suns players
Living people
Major League Baseball catchers
Baseball players from California
Sportspeople from Fresno, California
People from Camarillo, California
Daytona Beach Admirals players
Sportspeople from Ventura County, California
Bluefield Orioles players
Charlotte Knights players
Charlotte O's players
Newark Orioles players
Oklahoma City 89ers players
Rochester Red Wings players
Toledo Mud Hens players